I'm a Hustla is the second studio album by American hip hop recording artist Cassidy. It was released on June 28, 2005, by J and Full Surface Records. The album includes production from Bink, Devo Springsteen, Hi-Tek, Neo da Matrix, Nottz, L.E.S., The Individualz and Swizz Beatz, the latter of whom also executive produced the album. It features guest appearances from Nas, Quan, Mario, Mashonda, Raekwon, Lil Wayne, Fabolous and Mary J. Blige.

The album debuted at number 5 on the U.S. Billboard 200, with 93,000 copies sold in the first week. It was supported by the singles "I'm a Hustla" and "B-Boy Stance". The album's title-track features a sample from Jay-Z's "Dirt off Your Shoulder" and the song was nominated for a Vibe Award in the category Street Anthem. A remix featuring Mary J. Blige followed soon after. In 2006, the ringtone version of "I'm a Hustla" was one of the first-ever ringtones to be certified platinum.

Track listing

Singles
"I'm a Hustla"
 #34 (U.S. Billboard Hot 100)
 #71 (U.S. Billboard Hot Digital Songs)
 #5 (U.S. Billboard Hot Rap Tracks)
 #8 (U.S. Billboard Hot R&B/Hip-Hop Songs)
 #14 (U.S. Billboard Hot Ringtones)
 #69 (U.S. Billboard Pop 100)
"B-Boy Stance"
 #75 (U.S. Billboard Hot R&B/Hip-Hop Songs)

Samples
"I'm a Hustla" 
"Dirt off Your Shoulder" by Jay-Z
"Can't Fade Me"
 "Brown Baby" by Diana Ross
"So Long"
"Ain't It Good Feeling Good" performed by Eloise Laws
"Get 'Em"
"Getaway" written by Peter Cor & Beloyd Taylor
"The Message"
"Is It Because I'm Black" performed by Sly Johnson and from Tupac Resurrection by Tupac Shakur
"A.M. to P.M."
"I Want to Break Free" by Queen
"On The Grind" 
"Wildflowers" performed by New Birth
"6 Minutes" 
"Castles" performed by The Buoys

Charts

Weekly charts

Year-end charts

References

2005 albums
Cassidy (rapper) albums
Albums produced by Swizz Beatz
Albums produced by DJ Scratch
Albums produced by L.E.S. (record producer)
Albums produced by Needlz
Full Surface Records albums
J Records albums
Ruff Ryders Entertainment albums
Albums produced by Neo da Matrix